Alfonso Serrano (6 January 1921 – 9 July 2015) was a Mexican sailor who competed in the 1964 Summer Olympics.

References

1921 births
2015 deaths
Mexican male sailors (sport)
Olympic sailors of Mexico
Sailors at the 1964 Summer Olympics – Flying Dutchman